Neset may refer to:

Places
Enebakkneset (also called Neset), a village in Fet municipality, Viken county, Norway
Neset, Frøya, a village in Frøya municipality, Trøndelag county, Norway
Neset, Levanger, a village in Levanger municipality, Trøndelag county, Norway
Neset, Vestland, a village in Lindås municipality, Vestland county, Norway

See also
Nesset
Nes (disambiguation)